Emilio Azcárraga Milmo or Emilio Azcárraga Jr. (September 6, 1930 in San Antonio, Texas - April 16, 1997 outside Miami, Florida) was a Mexican-American businessman and the son of Emilio Azcárraga Vidaurreta and Laura Milmo Hickman. He was educated at Culver Military Academy, he graduated in 1948. He was married four times, to Nadine Jean, Pamela de Surmont (dead in 2001), Adriana Abascal, Miss Mexico in 1989 and most recently to Paula Cussi. He worked in various positions in television such as owner of Univision, a twelve-station Spanish-language network in the U.S., and in the 1960s and 1970s as a controlling shareholder of Televisa, S.A. He was the owner of The National, an American daily newspaper centered on sports that was published from January 31, 1990 to June 13, 1991. He also owned major Mexican television stations and was the chairman of the U.S.-based Spanish-language TV network "Galavisión". He was also involved in publishing, video rental, and real estate ventures. He died on April 16, 1997 on board his yacht ECO outside Miami. His business passed to his son Emilio Azcárraga Jean, and daughters.

See also
Azcárraga

References

1930 births
1997 deaths
Emilio Azcarraga Milmo
Mexican mass media owners
Mexican people of Basque descent
Mexican people of English descent
Mexican people of Irish descent
Businesspeople from San Antonio
American people of Mexican descent
Culver Academies alumni
Mexican television executives
20th-century American businesspeople
Chairmen of Televisa